The 1984 Tour was a concert tour by hard rock band Van Halen in support of their sixth studio album 1984.

Background
The stage set which was named "Metropolis" was described as the largest production ever taken on the road by a rock band, which consisted of approximately 175 tons of equipment and special effects which had to be hoisted and operated by a hundred chain motors, eight trucks to transport and five buses with almost 100 people to organize. On the stage were five crane devices that rose and lowered the lighting during the show, and at the conclusion of the show, would turn 90 degrees to spell out the numbers "1984" in bright white colors. The glam metal band Autograph supported Van Halen on a majority of their North American shows. At the time of the final three North American shows, Eddie Van Halen made a guest appearance on the Jacksons' Victory Tour, performing "Beat It" alongside Michael Jackson, when he and the rest of Van Halen were in Irving, Texas. Following the North American leg, the band flew off to Europe to perform on the Monsters of Rock tour which was part of the tour. At the conclusion of the tour, David Lee Roth left Van Halen as relations between him and the other members were at an all-time low.

Reception
Bob Andelman, a reporter from the St. Petersburg Times gave the Lakeland performance a positive review. Alongside his opening statements, he agreed heavily that Eddie Van Halen was the best guitarist working steadily who had knocked 10,000 screaming teenage fans over with his dazzling musical integrity and precision. Aside from the guitarist, Andelman praised the strong performances from Michael Anthony, Alex Van Halen and David Lee Roth, adding that Roth had added color and 'a touch of the circus' to the show. He also enjoyed the setlist, to which he praised the pleasure sensation of "Jump" which he said had caused the floor of the venue to reverberate and shake.

Michael Logan, a critic from The Day who had attended the New Haven concert gave the performance a positive review. He praised the band's sound as unique among heavy metal units due to the dynamics of Eddie Van Halen's guitar playing - but did not leave out Michael Anthony's bass solo, which Logan claimed that he thought Anthony was break-dancing. Logan added that both the lighting system for the show would make 'E.T. blush' and that the release of 1984 was timed to perfection, even though he said that Fair Warning was still his favorite album from the band. He concluded his review by stating the show was spectacle with the mention of the band having put other bands they were competing with to the dust but stated: "But this is 1984 and we're stuck with it."

Ethlie Ann Vare from Billboard who attended the Inglewood performance had stated: "A Van Halen concert is half rock, half vaudeville and half again as loud, raunchy, energetic, flashy and manic as it needs to be. Everything they did, they overdid. The monumental motor-driven lighting trusses looked like a prop from 'V: The Final Battle,' and threw off enough wattage to illuminate three night ballgames."

Setlist

Songs played overall
"Unchained"
"Hot for Teacher"
Alex Van Halen drum solo
"On Fire"
"Runnin' with the Devil"
"Little Guitars"
"Cathedral" and "House of Pain"
Michael Anthony bass solo
"Jamie's Cryin'"
"I'll Wait"
"Everybody Wants Some!!"
"Girl Gone Bad"
"Ice Cream Man" (John Brim cover)
"Summertime Blues" (Eddie Cochran cover)
"1984" and "Jump"
Eddie Van Halen guitar solo [and "Eruption", "Spanish Fly", "Little Guitars", "Women in Love..." and "Mean Street" (Intros)]
"Oh, Pretty Woman" (Roy Orbison cover)
"Panama"
"You Really Got Me" (The Kinks cover)
Encore
"Growth" and "Ain't Talkin' 'Bout Love" [and "Happy Trails" (Roy Rogers and Dale Evans cover)]

Typical set list
"Unchained"
"Hot for Teacher"
Alex Van Halen drum solo
"On Fire"
"Runnin' with the Devil"
"Little Guitars"
"Cathedral" and "House of Pain"
Michael Anthony bass solo
"Jamie's Cryin'"
"I'll Wait"
"Everybody Wants Some!!"
"Girl Gone Bad"
"1984" and "Jump"
Eddie Van Halen guitar solo [and "Eruption", "Spanish Fly", "Little Guitars", "Women in Love..." and "Mean Street" (Intros)
"Pretty Woman" (Roy Orbison cover)
"Panama"
"You Really Got Me" (The Kinks cover)
Encore
"Growth" and "Ain't Talkin' 'Bout Love" [and "Happy Trails" (Roy Rogers and Dale Evans cover)]

Tour dates

Box office score data

Personnel
 Eddie Van Halen – guitar, backing vocals, lead keyboards
 David Lee Roth – lead vocals, acoustic guitar
 Michael Anthony – bass, backing vocals, keyboards
 Alex Van Halen – drums

References

Citations

General sources

Van Halen concert tours
1984 concert tours